Dominique Fred is a Vanuatuan footballer who plays as a midfielder.

International goals 
As of match played 4 June 2016. Vanuatu score listed first, score column indicates score after each Fred goal.

References 

Living people
1992 births
Vanuatuan footballers
Vanuatu international footballers
Association football midfielders
Vanuatu youth international footballers
2012 OFC Nations Cup players
2016 OFC Nations Cup players